Air Illinois Flight 710 was a scheduled passenger flight from Chicago to Carbondale, Illinois. On the night of October 11, 1983, the Hawker Siddeley HS 748 operating the flight crashed near Pinckneyville, Illinois due to the flightcrew's mismanagement of electrical generator and distribution problems. All 10 passengers and crew were killed in the accident.

Accident sequence 
The flight flew from Chicago to Springfield, Illinois uneventfully, but when it touched down at Springfield Airport, the flight had been delayed by 45 minutes. At 20:20 local time, the aircraft took off from Springfield. Roughly 1.5 minutes after takeoff, the crew reported a 'slight electrical problem' and would keep air traffic control 'advised'.  The NTSB concluded that the first officer then mistakenly isolated the right generator instead of the left - as the right generator had a history of maintenance issues. Twelve minutes after takeoff, the first officer reported to the captain that the left generator was 'totally dead' and that the right generator was producing voltage but wouldn't stay online. Roughly 20 minutes after takeoff, the crew shut off excess lights in the cabin, but had failed to reduce overall electrical load on the aircraft's battery. Ultimately the battery was depleted, resulting in the failure of the aircraft's flight instruments, and communication and navigation radios. At 20:52, the captain decided to descend to 2,400 feet, from there the aircraft slowly descended into a hilly pasture area as the co-pilot used a flashlight to determine the location of the plane. The crew may have attempted a forced landing before the aircraft crashed, or a disoriented pilot mistook strip lighting at a mine for approach lights at Carbondale Airport. All ten on board perished.

The aircraft was heard by John Fisher and his wife Arilla circling over their property a couple of times. Arilla Fisher said that it had been raining pretty hard at the time of impact. She also said "The aircraft circled two times. It made a lot more noise the second time. I ran to the back porch. I saw one flash and heard a lot of noise. [John and I] could smell gas and fuel."   The 'flash' was reported to have been a brief flash fire from the spewing fuel and no explosion had taken place. The various victims were strewn across a quarter mile radius of the crash site. The largest recoverable section of the aircraft was the baggage compartment and the landing gear wheel section.

Investigation 
Accident investigators determined the probable cause to be "The captain's decision to continue the flight toward the more distant destination airport after the loss of d.c. electrical power from both aircraft generators instead of returning to the nearby departure airport. The captain's decision was adversely affected by self-imposed psychological factors which led him to assess inadequately the aircraft's battery endurance after the loss of generator power and the magnitude of the risks involved in continuing to the destination airport. Contributing to the accident was the airline management's failure to provide and the FAA's failure to assure an adequate company recurrent flight crew training programme which contributed to the captain's inability to assess properly the battery endurance of the aircraft before making the decision to continue, and led to the inability of the captain and the first officer to cope promptly and correctly with the aircraft's electrical malfunction."

The investigation revealed the captain, considered an "average pilot," was a "one-man operation" and did not welcome input from the co-pilot and was in a hurry to return to Carbondale after being on duty all day. The report said the captain had a habit of violating safety regulations in order to arrive on time, even disabling safety devices in order to overspeed the aircraft.

One investigator, Patricia A. Goldman, filed a concurring/dissenting statement. "While the accident report correctly identifies training and surveillance, I believe that inclusion of these items in the probable cause statement obscures and detracts from the basic reason the accident occurred and the attendant safety lesson. The pilot should never have continued the flight to the destination airport, but should have returned to the nearby airport on realizing that electrical d.c. power had been lost."

Cockpit voice recording

In popular culture 
The crash of Flight 710 was featured on season 22 of the Canadian documentary series Mayday, in the episode titled "Pitch Black".

Notes

References

External links

Evansville Press coverage of the crash
Cockpit voice recording

Aviation accidents and incidents in the United States in 1983
1983 in Illinois
Airliner accidents and incidents caused by pilot error
Airliner accidents and incidents in Illinois
Accidents and incidents involving the Hawker Siddeley HS 748
October 1983 events in the United States
Airliner accidents and incidents caused by electrical failure